In professional sports, a free agent is a player who is eligible to sign with other clubs or franchises; i.e., not under contract to any specific team.  The term is also used in reference to a player who is under contract at present but who is allowed to solicit offers from other teams. In some circumstances, the free agent's options are limited by league rules.

Types

Terms

Unrestricted free agent 
Unrestricted free agents are players without a team. They have either been released from their club, had the term of their contract expire without a renewal, or were not chosen in a league's draft of amateur players. These people, generally speaking, are free to entertain offers from all other teams in the player's most recent league and elsewhere and to decide with whom to sign a contract. Players who have been bought out of league standard contracts may have restrictions within that league, such as not being able to sign with the buy-out club for a period of time in the NHL, but are otherwise not restricted.

Restricted free agent 

The specific rules of restricted free agency vary among the major professional sports, but in principle it means that a player is currently signed to one team but is free to solicit contract offers from other teams; however, this player cannot sign with the competing club if the current club matches (or in some leagues, comes within 10% of) the terms of the offered contract. For a restricted free agent, some leagues require the comp team to offer to the original team one or more draft picks, when an offer is not matched, as compensation for losing the player.

Undrafted free agent 

Players who are not drafted in a league's annual draft of amateur players are considered to be unrestricted free agents and are free to negotiate contracts with any team. In most American professional sports, players are drafted by sequencing each team from worst to best (according to the teams' winloss records the previous season, sometimes invoking a draft lottery factor to avoid having teams intentionally lose their last games to gain higher draft position) and allowing said teams to claim rights to the top players entering the league that year. Players that pass through an entire draft (usually several rounds) without being selected by any of the league's teams become unrestricted free agents, and these players are sometimes identified simply as an undrafted free agent (UDFA) or undrafted sportsperson and are free to sign with any team they choose. The term "undrafted free agent" is most common in the National Football League (NFL), where rookies enter directly into the NFL and do not play in a minor league system. It can also occasionally be seen in the National Hockey League (NHL), which increasingly uses college hockey as a source; the NHL Entry Draft usually drafts players during high school age (i.e., junior leagues), which allows overlooked players who excel at the college level or in European professional leagues to bypass the draft and sign directly with the NHL.

Legal provisions in the EU 
In the European Union, the 1995 Bosman ruling by the European Court of Justice established the right of free agency for association football players in all EU member nations. The Bosman ruling has since been extended to cover other professional sports and players from Eastern Europe. Players were still tied to their clubs unless their contract ran out until the Webster ruling allowed players the opportunity to move between nations, though it does not allow free players to move within the national league in which they currently play.

Usage

Association football

In professional association football, a free agent is either a player that has been released by a  professional association football club and now is no longer affiliated with any league, or a player whose contract with his or her current club has expired and is thus free to join any other club under the terms of the Bosman ruling.

Free agents do not have to be signed during the normal transfer window that is implemented in some countries' leagues. If they are signed by a team, the team signing them does not have to pay any fees – sometimes this is known as "a free transfer".

If a player is released from their club when the transfer window is closed, they cannot sign for another team until the window reopens.  A notable case of this being Sol Campbell who in September 2009 was released from Notts County, just after a month from signing on a free transfer.  He signed for his former club Arsenal in January 2010 during the winter transfer window, after spending a few months training with the team to maintain his fitness.

Australian Football League (AFL)
The Australian Football League introduced free agency at the end of 2012, after having had a brief "ten-year rule" in 1973 (when it was known as the Victorian Football League).

Out-of-contract players who are not within the top 25% paid players at their club will become unrestricted free agents after eight seasons of service at one club. Out-of-contract players who are within the top 25% paid players at their club become restricted free agents after eight seasons, then become unrestricted free agents after ten seasons. 
Clubs receive compensation in the form of draft picks for the loss of out-of-contract free agents, but players who are delisted become unrestricted free agents, regardless of length of service, and clubs are not compensated for the transfer of such free agents.

Major League Baseball (MLB)

National Basketball Association (NBA)

National Football League (NFL)
The NFL's current free agency system was introduced on March 1, 1993.

Exclusive-rights free agents
Exclusive-rights free agents (ERFAs) are players with two or fewer seasons of service time and whose contracts have expired. If their team tenders a qualifying offer (a one-year contract usually at league-minimum salary) the player has no negotiating rights with other teams, and must either sign the tender with the team or sit out the season.

Restricted free agents
Restricted free agents (RFAs) are players who have three accrued seasons of service and whose contracts have expired.  RFAs have received qualifying offers from their old clubs and are free to negotiate with any club until a deadline which occurs approximately a week prior to the NFL Draft (for  the deadline was April 15), at which time their rights revert to their original club. If a player accepts an offer from a new club, the old club will have the right to match the offer and retain the player. If the old club elects not to match the offer, it may receive draft-choice compensation depending on the level of the qualifying offer made to the player.

Unrestricted free agents
Unrestricted free agents are players with expired contracts that have completed four or more accrued seasons of service. They are free to sign with any franchise.

Undrafted free agents
Undrafted free agents are players eligible for the NFL Draft but were not selected; they can negotiate and sign with any team.

"Plan B" free agency
Plan B free agency was a type of free agency that became active in the National Football League in February 1989 to 1992. Plan B free agency permitted all teams in the NFL to preserve limited rights of no more than 37 total players a season; if a player was a protected Plan B free agent, he was incapable of signing with another team without providing his old team the first opportunity to sign him again. The rest of the players were left unprotected, liberated to negotiate contracts with the rest of the teams in the league.

Eight players sued the NFL in U.S. federal court, stating that Plan B was an unlawful restraint of trade. In 1992, a jury found that Plan B violated antitrust laws and awarded damages to these players.

National Hockey League (NHL) 
In the National Hockey League (NHL), between 2005 and 2008, the age of unrestricted free agency declined from 31 to 27. Under the old collective agreement, which expired in 2004, draft picks were awarded as compensation when a team lost an unrestricted free agent; however, under the current CBA teams losing unrestricted free agents do not receive any compensation.

In addition, any player at least 22 years of age who has not been selected in the NHL Entry Draft can sign with any team as a free agent. Any player who is not entry-level, but does not meet the qualifications of unrestricted free agency becomes a restricted free agent when his contract expires.

Major League Soccer (MLS) 
Players eligible for free agency are 24 years of age and older with five MLS service years and are out of contract or have had their option declined.

Major League Rugby (MLR) 
In Major League Rugby, a player can be signed by any team as a free agent at 18 years old as long as they don't enroll in college. In case they do, they have to wait for MLR Draft at 21 years old.

Deadlines 
In some leagues, free agency has deadlines. For example, under the most recent NHL Collective Bargaining Agreement, restricted free agents who do not sign contracts by December 1 of a given year will be ineligible to play in the National Hockey League for the balance of that season. However, other leagues (such as the National Basketball Association) have no such restrictions on signing periods in season, despite having a free agency moratorium in the offseason. 

In Europe, players can only move during transfer windows—during the close season and halfway through the league season. There are exceptions for unsigned professional players in the lower divisions.

See also
 Draft (sports)

References 

Terminology used in multiple sports
Major League Baseball labor relations
National Hockey League labor relations
Sports labor relations